Harts of the West is a humorous contemporary western about a Chicago family moving to a run-down Nevada ranch. The series consisted of 15 hour-long episodes that aired on CBS Saturdays, 9:00 to 10:00 p.m., from September 1993 until June 1994.

Much of the series was shot on location in downtown Mayer, Arizona, a small town near Prescott.  Clint Black wrote and sang the theme song, In a Laid Back Way.

CBS scheduled the series between two popular westerns: Dr. Quinn: Medicine Woman and Walker, Texas Ranger, and it received positive reviews. One reviewer wrote "Don’t make the mistake of ignoring Harts of the West", and another stated the show was "One of the fall season's more appealing new series." However, the series left the schedule in January 1994, with a few final episodes being shown in June 1994.

Synopsis
Dave Hart was a lingerie salesman in Chicago who'd always dreamed of being a cowboy. He had named his three children after western writers and an actor – 16-year-old son Zane after Zane Grey, 15-year-old daughter L'Amour after Louis L’Amour, and 10-year-old son John Wayne (called Duke) after the famous western star. After suffering a mild heart attack Dave decided to follow his dream, and purchased the Flying Tumbleweed Ranch, sight unseen, after reading a sales brochure published in 1957. Duke is the only other family member in favor of moving out West.

The property is a dude ranch in disrepair, near the town of Sholo, Nevada, population 90. Sholo's business district has a trading post - grocery store run by a Native American named Auggie, and the Hanging Tree Cafe, run by the sheriff, R.O., and his ex-wife Rose.

Dave goes out to the Flying Tumbleweed and is shot at by Jake, a grizzled ex-convict who claims to be the ranch foreman. Jake informs Dave that the man who sold the ranch has died, and his ashes are scattered over the Flying Tumbleweed. The foreman is able to find a group of motley ranch hands, some with a prison record. Dave's wife, Allie, is willing to try ranch life for a while, though the elder children initially have little enthusiasm for the idea.

Cast
Beau Bridges as Dave Hart (ranch owner)
Harley Jane Kozak  as Alison (Allie) Hart (Dave's wife)
Lloyd Bridges as Jake Tyrell (ranch foreman)
Sean Murray as Zane Grey Hart (16-year-old son, infatuated with Cassie)
Meghann Haldeman as L'Amour Hart (15-year-old daughter)
Nathan Watt as John Wayne (Duke) Hart (10-year-old son)
Saginaw Grant as Auggie Velasquez (trading post owner)
Talisa Soto as Cassie Velasquez (Auggie's granddaughter)
Stephen Root as R.O. Moon (sheriff and cafe owner)
O-Lan Jones as Rose McLaughlin (cafe waitress and R.O.'s ex-wife)
Sterling Mucer, Jr. as Marcus St. Cloud (ranch hand and ex-convict lawyer)
Dennis Fimple as Garral (ranch hand who is always spitting)

Episodes

Media availability
In 2005 Tango released the Harts of the West series set on DVD. On October 17, 2017 Mill Creek Entertainment released the DVD set Harts of the West The Complete Series.

References

1990s Western (genre) television series
1993 American television series debuts
1994 American television series endings
Television shows set in Nevada
Television shows filmed in Arizona